The Buckeye Falcon is an American powered parachute that was designed and produced by Buckeye Industries.

Design and development
The Falcon was designed as a high-end, two-place ultralight trainer. It features a parachute-style high-wing, two seats in tandem or just a single seat, tricycle landing gear and a single  Rotax 582 liquid-cooled engine in pusher configuration as standard equipment.

The aircraft is built from a combination of bolted aluminium and 4130 steel tubing. In flight steering is accomplished via foot pedals that actuate the canopy brakes, creating roll and yaw. On the ground the aircraft has lever-controlled nosewheel steering. The main landing gear incorporates spring rod suspension. The aircraft was factory supplied in the form of an assembly kit that requires 30–40 hours to complete.

Specifications (Falcon)

References

1990s United States ultralight aircraft
Single-engined pusher aircraft
Powered parachutes